Geng Yan (3–58 AD) was a Chinese general of the Eastern Han Dynasty. He was the son of Geng Kuang (耿況), who was the governor of Shanggu Commandery (上谷, roughly modern Zhangjiakou, Hebei). He initially served Emperor Guangwu of Han as clerk; later, he became one of the Emperor's most important generals, and contributed to the establishment of the Later Han Dynasty. Emperor Ming honored Geng among those who had served his father well by painting their portraits on a palace tower(云台二十八将, 28 Generals of Yuntai); Geng's portrait was placed in the fourth position.

References
 Hou Han Shu by Fan Ye, vol. 1 (Biography of Emperor Guangwu), .

AD 3 births
58 deaths
Han dynasty generals
1st-century Chinese military personnel